Miss Thailand World 2018 was the 28th edition of the Miss Thailand World auditioned on July 21-July 22, 2018. Pageant held at The Berkeley Pratunam Hotel in Bangkok on 15 September 2018. Jinnita Buddee from Chiang Rai crowned her successor at the end of the event.

The coronation pageant was broadcast  live on Channel 3 Thailand. The crowned winner was Nicolene Bunchu of Bangkok represented Thailand at  Miss World 2018 competition in Sanya, China on December 8, 2018. She went on to achieve the Runner Up position, the highest position ever achieved by a Thai candidate at Miss World.

Final results 

★ Went To Top 12 by Fast Track

Special Awards

 
 Sponsor Award in Ace of Hua Hin Resort, Prachuap Khiri Khan

Fast Track

Top Model 
Praewwanit Ruangthong won the Top Model Competition and became the first semi-finalist of Miss Thailand World 2018.

Talent 
Siriporn Phasomsap won the Talent Competition and became the second semi-finalist of Miss Thailand World 2018.

Sport

People's Choice 

 Best Portrait award was selected by Cindy Bishop, Vinij Boonchaisri and Narin Laorujirakul. All three will receive 100 vote points each. On air in Miss Thailand World 2018 The Reality EP. 2

Delegates 
30 contestants competed for the title. The information from Miss Thailand World Official website.

Withdrawal
 Sumitra Noenphrom withdrew from the competition due to personal reasons. She was originally candidate #21 and her spot was replaced by candidate #31 Khunanya Chomphulong.

Notes
Nicolene Bunchu, Miss Thailand World 2018, placed in the 1st Runner-up, Continental Queen of Asia and won Head-To-Head Challenge (Round 1 and 2) at Miss World 2018 held on December 8, 2018 at the Sanya City Arena in Sanya, China. In 2022, she is competing at Miss Universe Thailand 2022 where she placed in the 1st Runner-up.
Ruechanok Meesang, Top 12 in Miss Thailand World 2018, she competed at Miss Chinese International Pageant 2019 held on March 2, 2019 at Hong Kong where she was unplaced but won Miss Friendship, and later she was crowned Miss International Thailand 2022 and competed at Miss International 2022 held on December 13, 2022 at the Tokyo Dome City Hall, Tokyo, Japan where she was unplaced.
Praewwanich Ruangthong, 1st Runner-up in Miss Thailand World 2018, she was crowned at Miss Supranational Thailand 2022 and competed at Miss Supranational 2022 held on July 15, 2022 at the Strzelecki Park Amphitheater, Nowy Sącz, Małopolska, Poland where she was placed in the 1st Runner-up.

See also
 Miss World 2018

References

External links
 

Beauty pageants in Thailand
2018 beauty pageants
2018 Thai television seasons
Miss Thailand World